Konstantīns Calko (born 13 April 1994) is the first Latvian racing driver competing in the 24 Hours of Le Mans.

Racing career
Konstantins began his career in 2001 in karting. Since then he became numerous Latvian champion in various karting categories.  In 2011 he switched to the Baltic Touring Car Championship. Next year Calko raced in Radical European Masters and secured Champion title in Supersports category as well took World Vice-Champion title in DD2 category in Rotax Grand Finals held in Portimao  In 2013 Calko made his World Touring Car Championship debut with Campos Racing driving a SEAT León WTCC in the last round in Macau.

In February 2015 it was announced that he would make his European Le Mans Series debut with SVK by Speed Factory driving a Ginetta LMP3. Finished season on 3rd.

In 2017 Calko fulfilled his life dream and competed in 2017 24 Hours of Le Mans race with ARC Bratislava. Though technical failures with the car prevented to reach high results. After few months later in Asian Le Mans Series 2017/2018 season together with the same team Calko finished 3rd in championship.

In 2018 together with Red Camel Jordans team won Creventic 24H Silverstone overall and TCE class.

Racing record

Complete World Touring Car Championship results
(key) (Races in bold indicate pole position – 1 point awarded just in first race; races in italics indicate fastest lap – 1 point awarded all races; * signifies that driver led race for at least one lap – 1 point given all races)

† Driver did not finish the race, but was classified as he completed over 90% of the race distance.

24 Hours of Le Mans results

References

External links
 

1994 births
Living people
World Touring Car Championship drivers
Latvian racing drivers
Sportspeople from Daugavpils
24 Hours of Le Mans drivers
International GT Open drivers
Campos Racing drivers
24H Series drivers